Mirchi Music Awards South is the South Indian segment of the annual Mirchi Music Awards, presented by Radio Mirchi to honour both artistic and technical excellence of professionals in the South Indian music industry. The awards are separately given for Tamil, Telugu, Malayalam and Kannada films. The awards were first given in 2010 for the best of 2009 and the ceremony was held at the Nehru Indoor Stadium on 17 July 2010.The print partner was The Times of India. The broadcast partners are Star's Kannada offering Suvarna TV, Star's Tamil channel Vijay TV, Zee Telugu & ETV, Star's Malayalam channel Asianet plus. The second edition was held in Nehru Indoor Stadium on 10 September 2011.

History

Hosts

The award first instituted in 2009 was held on 17 July 2010 in Nehru Indoor Stadium. It was hosted by Shiva an RJ of Radio Mirchi and Director Venkat Prabhu. The second edition held on 10 September 2011 was also held in Nehru Indoor Stadium hosted by Shiva and hostess Pooja.

Multiple wins

Tamil

Awards
4 Award: kaththi
2 Awards: Enthiran, Paiyaa, Ayan, Mynaa, Siva Manasula Sakthi, Raavanan, Goa, Vennila Kabadi Kuzhu

Telugu

Awards
5 Awards: Arya 2, Orange
2 Awards: Khaleja, Maghadheera

Kannada

Awards
4 Awards: Jackie, Manasaare
3 Awards: Savari, Krishnan Love Story
2 Awards: Ambaari, Chirru, Karanji,

Malayalam

Awards
6 Awards: Banaras
5 Awards: Karayilekku Oru Kadal Dooram
2 Awards: Anwar

Trophy

The accolade given to the winners of the Southern Industry is same as given to the Bollywood awardees. It portrays a human partially folding his knee and leaving his hands free. The winners of "Upcoming category" will receive a Certificate of Merit and not a trophy.

Jury

There will be two set of juries to decide the awards - a screening jury to short list the entries and a Grand Jury, with whom rests the task of finalizing the winners for each award. The entire process of screening, shortlisting and selection of winners is audited by Ernst & Young. Each of the four south Indian languages will have separate Jury panels headed by a chairman.
The list of Jury and chairman for each language's jury for both years:

Tamil

The Jury chairman for both the years was Gangai Amaren. As for the year of 2009 many eminent personalities were selected as the jury; they are: Sudha Raghunathan, Arivumathi, S. Ve. Shekher, A. S. Lakshmi Narayanan, Bharadwaja, James Vasanthan, Malaysia Vasudevan (Late), Lingusamy, Na. Muthukumar, S. A. Rajkumar. In 2010 most of the jury members were changed except for Sudha Raghunathan and Arivumathi. They were: Malathy Lakshman, Snehan, Vijay Antony, A. L. Vijay, Vetrimaran, Pushpavanam Kuppusamy, Vasanth, Manicka Vinayagam, Sabesh

Telugu

The chairman for the jury for both the years was D. Suresh Babu. For the year of 2009 the jury members were: Anantha Sreeram, Amma Rajasekhar, Chakri, Chandrabaose, Tanikella Bharani, Koti, Devi Sri Prasad, Ramana Gogula, K. K. Senthil Kumar, Sunitha Upadrashta. In 2010 except Chandrabose, Saluri Koteswara Rao and Sunitha all the others were changed, the jury members for 2010 are: Ramana Gogula, Patnaik, Ramajogayya Sastry, K. M. Radha Krishnan, V. Madhusudhana Rao, Marthand K. Venkatesh, Hasam Raja, Raju. For 2021, Tanikella Bharani, Bhaskarabhatla, Jeevitha, D. Suresh Babu, Raghu Kunche, R. P. Patnaik, Madhura Sreedhar Reddy, Kousalya, M. M. Srilekha, Kalyan Koduri and Haasam Raja were the jury members.

Kannada

The chairman of the jury for both the years was Hamsalekha. For 2009 the other jury members were: V. Harikrishna, Gurukiran, Mano Murthy, Manjula Gururaj, Raghu Dixit, Rajesh Krishnan, Nagathihalli Chandrashekhar, Yograj Bhat. In 2010 in the place of Mano Murthy, Raghu Dixit and Yograj Bhat, Raghavendra Rajkumar, V. Manohar, Raghavendra Rajkumar were placed

Malayalam

The chairman of jury for both the years was Kaithapram Damodaran Namboothiri. The other jury members for 2009 are: Aashiq Abu, Anil Panachooran, K. S. Chitra, Deepak Dev, Jassie Gift, Jency Anthony, Johnson Master, M. Jayachandran, Raghu Kumar, Sibi Malayil. In 2010 Anil Panachooran, K. S. Chitra, Deepak Dev were replaced by Vayalar Sarath Chandra Varma and Arundathi

Award categories

The event honours the awardees under 17 broad categories in Tamil. It honours the Telugu, Malayalam and Kannada winners under 15 broad Categories.Mannin Kural - Male/Female is awarded only for the Tamil Music Industry. In 2009 Critica Choice Best Song - Song/Album were given. They was removed in 2010 and only 15 categories were awarded for Telugu, Kannada and Malayalam music industry and Tamil music industry was awarded with 17.

Jury awards

Best Upcoming Lyricist
2009
 	

		 	
2010	

2011	

2012	

2013

2014

2015

2016

2017

2018

Best Upcoming Music Director

2009

2010	

2011	

2012	

2016

Best Upcoming Male Singer

2009

2010	

2011	

2012	

2016

Best Upcoming Female Singer

2009

2010

2011

2012	

2012

Best Female Playback Singer

2009

2010

2011

2012	

2013

2014

2015

2016

2017

2018

2019

Best Male Playback Singer

2009

2010

2011	

2012	

2013

2014

2015

2016	

2017

2018

Best Music Director

2009

2010

2011

2012	

2016

Best Lyricist

2009

2010

2011

2012	

2016	

2021

Song of the Year

2009

2010

2011

2012	

2013

2014

2015

2016

Album of the Year

2009

2010

2011

2012	

2013

2014

2015

2021

Mannin Kural - Male
This award is given only to Tamil Music Industry

Manin Kural - Female
This award is given only to Tamil Music Industry

Listeners Choice Award

Mirchi Listeners' Choice - Album of the Year

2009

2010

2011

2012	

2015	

2021

Mirchi Listeners' Choice - Song of the Year

2009

2010

2011

2012	

2016

Technical Awards

Technical Sound Engineer Award

2009

2010

2011

2012

Special awards

Jury Award for outstanding contribution to Film Music Industry

2009

2010

2011

2012

Lifetime achievement award

2009

2010

2011

See also
 Mirchi Music Awards
 Radio Mirchi

References

External links
 
 1st Mirchi Music Awards South Winners
 2nd Mirchi Music Awards South Winners
 Rules and Regulations for qualifying for the Award
 3rd Mirchi Music Awards South Winners - Tamil
 3rd Mirchi Music Awards South Winners - Telugu
 3rd Mirchi Music Awards South Winners - Malayalam
 3rd Mirchi Music Awards South Winners - Kannada

Indian film awards
Awards established in 2009
Indian music awards
Tamil film awards
Telugu film awards